The 1931 Colorado Mines Orediggers football team was an American football team that represented Colorado School of Mines during the 1931 college football season as a member of the Rocky Mountain Conference. In their fifth year under head coach George H. Allen, the team compiled a 1–5–1 record.

Schedule

References

Colorado Mines
Colorado Mines Orediggers football seasons
Colorado Mines Orediggers football